Eduardo Caba (Potosi, Bolivia, 1890 - La Paz, Bolivia, 1953) was a Bolivian nationalist composer, a pianist and a music professor. He spent the most part of his professional life in Buenos Aires and his last ten years in La Paz.

Biography 
His parents were "Dr. Gregorio Caba, a distinguished Bolivian doctor, and Adelina Balsalia, an Italian lady of high culture and with a fine musical spirit". According to Salas and Pauletto (1938), Eduardo Caba's mother was his first music teacher.

In 1926, he moved to Buenos Aires and completed his higher studies in harmony. There he attended the classes of the Argentinean composer Felipe Boero. In 1927, he obtained a scholarship by the Bolivian government allowing him to improve his skills in Madrid where he was the alumnus of Joaquín Turina and of Pérez Casas. However, the Bolivian government withdrew its commitment and Caba was forced to give up his studies. Shortly later, Caba returned to Buenos Aires and integrated into Argentinean society, where he made good friends. His reputation grew, and his works were played at the Teatro Colón. In 1942, Caba moved from Buenos Aires to his home country after being appointed director of the National Conservatory of Music of La Paz. He also lived for two years in Montevideo with his family.

From the outset of his career Caba won the praise of the renowned Spanish musicologist Adolfo Salazar, as Salas and Pauletto underscores, citing Salazar's comments in his book Música y músicos de hoy (1928) as well as his articles in the Spanish journal El Sol.

His compositions were interpreted at the La Revue musicale in Paris by the pianist Ricardo Viñes, one of the most active promoters of Caba's works, and the French composer and founder of the Revue, Henry Prunières, considered Caba as one of the most important representatives of values in Latin America. Ninon Vallin, the French soprano who often stayed in Buenos Aires and was present at twenty seasons of the Teatro Colón, has also interpreted Caba's works. Other promoters of the music of Caba include Beatriz Balzi and Mariana Alandia.

Style 
The musicologists Salas and Pauletto consider Caba as an "intuitive composer with the vernacular motives of his homeland". The vernacular aspects are probably the most characteristic of Caba's musical language.

But the intuitive character of Caba's work is probably the most interesting, and it is interesting to understand the origin of this "intuition". Salas and Pauletto, who knew personally Eduardo Caba, explain it in the following way:

A representative example of Caba's music is his dance Kollavina, recently interpreted by the Bolivian guitarist Marcos Puña, and presented in the book of the two aforementioned musicologists.

Private life 
Eduardo Caba married María del Carmen Huergo in Buenos Aires and had two sons, Gregorio et María Adelia.

Main works 
 9 Aires indios (de Bolivia)
 Aires indios de Bolivia:
 Andantino
 Con reposo
 Reposado muy expresivo
 Calmado y expresivo
 Andantino
 Allegretto
 Ocho motivos folklóricos de los valles de Bolivia (eight folkloric motives from the valleys of Bolivia):
 Allegretto
 Alegre moderato y expresivo
 Alegre y ritmo justo
 Andante expresivo
 Allegretto expresivo
 Un poco lento y expresivo
 Moderato
 Alegre moderato
 Flor de bronce
 Kapuri (La Hilandera)
 Flor de amor
 Kollavina
 Indiecita
 Kori-Killa (Luna de oro) 
 Himno al Sol, (version for piano)
 Potosí, Symphonic poem containing:
 Leyenda Kechua
 Monólogo Kechua
 Danza Kechua
 Danzata, containing four dances for lute quartet

Bibliography 
  Adolfo Salazar (1928). Música y músicos de hoy. Madrid: Editorial El Mundo Latino.
  Samuel J.A. Salas, Pedro I. Pauletto, Pedro J.S. Salas (1938). Historia de la Música. Second volume: América Latina. Buenos Aires: Editorial José Joaquín de Araujo.
  Enzo Valenti Ferro (1983). Las voces: Teatro Colón, 1908-1982. Buenos Aires: Ediciones de Arte Gaglianone, .
  Franklin Anaya Arze (1994). La música en Latinoamérica y en Bolivia. Cochabamba: Editorial Serrano.

References

External links 
  Article by Elías Blanco Mamani, elias-blanco.blogspot.
  Compositores bolivianos in biografiascompbolivia.
  Article by Alfredo Solíz Béjar, Pentagrama del Recuerdo.com.
  Article by Rey González in LaRazón, 2015, La Paz, Bolivia.

1890 births
1953 deaths
20th-century classical composers
20th-century male musicians
20th-century pianists
Bolivian composers
Bolivian expatriates in Argentina
Bolivian male musicians
Bolivian pianists
Male classical composers
Male pianists
People from Potosí